John Shaffer may refer to:
 John Shaffer (politician), American politician and businessman
 John Shaffer (baseball), American baseball player
 John H. Shaffer, American administrator of the Federal Aviation Administration